The riwana is a type of fretless flute played in Himachal Pradesh, generally with four strings, and an additional string starting from midway down the neck, like the American five-string banjo.

See also
Pamiri rubab, a similar instrument of eastern Tajikistan

Drumhead lutes
Necked bowl lutes
Music of Himachal Pradesh